Arubiddy Station is a pastoral lease that operates as a sheep station in Western Australia.

The station is composed of open grassland and saltbush with no salt lakes or heavy scrub, all divided into 44 well fenced paddocks that respond quickly after rain. No surface water sources exist and bores are used to water stock.

Arrubiddy was established in 1961 along with other properties in the area, including Rawlinna, Kanandah and Moonera Stations, then later Kybo and Balgair were established.

The current homestead was built in 1969, constructed from brick and has three bedrooms, one bathroom and two loungerooms. Another cottage exists near the homestead with quarters for another twenty staff with mess facilities, known as the shearers' quarters. There is a two bedroom cottage also located near the homestead for an overseer. There is also a three bedroom house located near the highway for another staff member and their family.

The Brown family took over at Arubiddy in the 1970s and continued to improve the property.
In 2003 a field trial involving the making of hay out of the native grass, speargrass (Austrostipa scabra), at Kanandah station had bales sent to Arubiddy to be used as feed for wethers. The station owners and managers, the Brown family, conducted the trial and found the feed to have environmental and economic benefits.

The property, along with a flock of 17,000 sheep, was passed in at auction in 2009 for 2.8 million. Arubiddy Station was still on the market for sale .

See also
List of ranches and stations
List of pastoral leases in Western Australia

References

Pastoral leases in Western Australia
Stations (Australian agriculture)
Homesteads in Western Australia
Goldfields-Esperance
Nullarbor Plain
1961 establishments in Australia